Tonichi is a town in the Soyopa Municipality, in the eastern region of the Mexican state of Sonora near the Río Yaqui. The elevation is 180 meters.

The population was 224 in 2005. The jesuits build a church In the 17th century.

The area around Tonichi is rich in minerals. 

Near the municipality is the district of charcoal from Santa Clara.

Geography of Sonora